NeoTokyo (stylized as NEOTOKYO°) is a multiplayer tactical first-person shooter total conversion modification of Half-Life 2 in a futuristic cyberpunk setting, created by American developer Studio Radi-8. Initially released on July 3, 2009, and later re-released for Steam on July 4, 2014, it was voted to be released through Steam Greenlight on 16 October 2012. The game presents itself in a dystopian setting, with inspiration drawn from Akira, Deus Ex and Ghost in the Shell for its art-style, music and aesthetics.

Gameplay

NeoTokyo uses a round-based structure similar to Counter-Strike, with players only respawning between rounds. Three character classes are available, differing from each other in speed, health and available weaponry. Each class has a different auxiliary vision mode (light amplification, motion detection and thermal vision) with the two lightest classes possessing thermal and optical cloaking.

The gameplay of NeoTokyo is slow-paced and balanced towards the tactical approach, with players generally being able to dispose of each other with a single burst of concentrated fire. The map design reflects this, with most maps giving numerous opportunities for ambushes and flanking.

NeoTokyo has two game-types: Team Deathmatch (TDM), and Capture The Ghost (CTG), with the majority of maps designed for the latter. Capture The Ghost is similar to one-flag CTF, with two teams competing to pick up the Ghost (a dismembered gynoid torso) and carry it to a designated 'retrieval zone' on the other side of the map. Unlike regular CTF, a team can also win the round by eliminating the other team. The Ghost is useful for this as it allows the player carrying it (and only that player) to see the position of the still remaining enemy team members, even through walls. In-game VoIP communication and a compass allows a Ghost carrier to communicate this information to their own team. While carrying the Ghost brings great benefits to a team, there are severe downsides to picking up the Ghost. With the Ghost's exact location visible to everyone at all times, a carrier's position is instantly revealed to the enemy team. Being required to drop their primary weapon before being able to pick it up and being unable to sprint are just some of the severe disadvantages of picking up the Ghost.

Plot
NeoTokyo is set in Tokyo, approximately 30 years in the future. After the failure of a proposal to alter the Japanese constitution to allow foreign deployment of Japanese soldiers, a military coup d'état is attempted by extreme Japanese nationalist factions in the Japan Self-Defense Forces. In response, the Prime Minister of Japan pools former military intelligence operatives and police officers into a sub-group of the Interior Ministry's National Security Force (NSF), called Group Six, to seek out subsequent coup plotters and uphold the law in both domestic and international soil. Immediately, rumours surface that an unknown faction in the JGSDF's special forces unit "Jinrai" is preparing for another coup attempt against the government. According to the information, the said members of this group are from Special Operations Group 43, fierce ultranationalists determined to succeed with the coup once more. The ensuing strife between these two factions sets the backdrop for the game.

Development
NeoTokyo has been in development since October 2004. Originally designed as a mod for Unreal Tournament 2004 as a deathmatch game with capture points, NeoTokyo's development was later switched to Valve's 2006 Source engine, where the game was remade from scratch and released in 2009.

Ghost in the Shell and Akira were cited as main sources of inspiration behind the game's art style and cyberpunk aesthetic.

The Radi-8 team ceased development of the game soon after its release on the Steam platform, however, remaining fans have attempted multiple times to revive the game with community content.
Many are full rewrites or reworks of the game, such as rewriting the game in a newer branch of the Source Engine.

Soundtrack
The soundtrack of NeoTokyo was composed by Ed Harrison, and was described as "haunting" by Jeff Fleming of Game Set Watch. After being recruited from a forum, he also contributed to early sound design before focusing entirely on music. A soundtrack CD was released through CD Baby. He has since self-released the album as a free digital download.

Reception
NeoTokyo was featured in the "Mod World" section of the September 2009 issue of Game Informer. The game has also been featured on gaming website Kotaku, where it was stated that the game "looks completely amazing." It won second place for the 2008 Upcoming Mod of the Year Award.

In February 2010, NeoTokyo placed third in Mod DB's competition for mod of the year.

In August 2012, Glasseater, the lead tester for NeoTokyo, placed an entry for the game in the Steam Greenlight. The game quickly became popular, ranking among the top 15 games on Greenlight. The following October, the game was approved, eventually seeing release on the Steam platform on 4 July 2014.

Since its Steam release, NeoTokyo's player counts have declined drastically. Besides during semi-organized events on Friday each week, the game servers are generally empty.

Reimplementation
In July 2019, Neotokyo community leader Rain began work on an open-source reimplementation of Neotokyo in the Source 2013 engine. This project is currently being worked on, and is funded through a Patreon. The goal of the project is to allow the community to maintain and expand the game despite the absence of the original development team, rather than to create an actual sequel. However, its status now remains unknown.

References

External links
 
 Neotokyo GSDF (soundtrack pt. 1) on Bandcamp
 Neotokyo NSF (soundtrack pt. 2) on Bandcamp

2009 video games
Cyberpunk video games
First-person shooters
Multiplayer online games
Source (game engine) games
Source (game engine) mods
Video games developed in the United States
Windows games
Windows-only games
Steam Greenlight games